Meta Hrovat (born 2 March 1998) is a Slovenian World Cup alpine ski racer. On 24 October 2022, she announced her retirement from alpine skiing.

World Cup results

Season standings

Race podiums

 4 podiums – (4 GS)

World Championship results

Olympic results

References

External links

 
 Meta Hrovat World Cup standings at the International Ski Federation
 
 

1998 births
Living people
Slovenian female alpine skiers
Alpine skiers at the 2018 Winter Olympics
Alpine skiers at the 2022 Winter Olympics
Olympic alpine skiers of Slovenia
Alpine skiers at the 2016 Winter Youth Olympics